Koulikoro Region (Bambara: ߞߎߟߌߞߏߙߏ ߘߌߣߋߖߊ tr. Kulikoro Dineja) is a region in western Mali. It is the second administrative area of Mali and covers an area of 90,120 km2. Its capital is the city of Koulikoro.

Geography 
The region of Koulikoro is bordered by Mauritania on the north, the region of Kayes on the west, by Guinea and the region of Sikasso on the south, and by the region of Ségou to the east. In 2009 the Koulikoro Region had a population of 2,418,305. These were mainly Bambaras, Malinkés Sonikes and  around the Niger River.

The region is irrigated by several rivers, including the Niger, Baoulé, Sankarani, Baogé, Bani and Bafing. The climate of the region's south has the high rainfall typical of the Sudan, while north of the Kita-Bamako axis, it tends to a Sahelian aridity.

The largest cities of the region are Kati, Koulikoro, Kolokani, Nara, Banamba and Dioïla; however the most populous commune is Kalabancoro. The Boucle du Baoulé National Park and the natural reserves of Fina, Kongossambougou and Badinko shelter a diversity of wildlife.

History 

The region of Koulikoro is the seat of several great empires which followed one another in Mali: the Ghana Empire, the Sosso Empire and the Mali Empire.

Culture 

The land of the Manding (or Mandé) is located in this area. It is the cradle of the Empire of Mali and known for preserving its traditional culture with its griots and its hunters. Like much of Mali, the area is strongly Islamized, but the practices of animists remain very present in the villages. Bambara serves as the area's most common language.

Koulikoro is famous for its traditional puppet theater, showcased in many festivals such as in the village of Diarabougou.   
Several musicians are natives of the region, including  Salif Keita and Rokia Traoré.

Transport and economy 

Koulikoro is the terminus of the Dakar-Niger railway. It is also an important port on the Niger River which makes it possible to serve the towns of Ségou, Mopti, Tombouctou and Gao. The area is served by the airport of Bamako-sénou.

Agriculture remains the dominant economic activity, although several industries are present in the district, such as the Hydroelectric dam of Sélingué, gold-bearing industries around Kangaba, and  the cotton production site in Fana, Mali's second largest.

Administrative subdivisions 

The Koulikoro Region is divided into seven cercles encompassing 106 communes:

Mali's capital (Bamako) is located in the heart of the region, but forms a separate administrative entity called the Bamako Capital District; it is entirely surrounded by Kati Cercle.

See also
Regions of Mali
Cercles of Mali

References

External links
.

 
Regions of Mali